Augustine Njoku Obi  (1930 – 2003) was a Nigerian Professor of virology and former President of the Nigerian Academy of Science.
He was known for developing a cholera vaccine approved as efficacy in 1971 by WHO.
 
In 1985, he was elected President of the Nigerian Academy of Science to succeeded Professor Emmanuel Emovon.

References

1930 births
2003 deaths
Nigerian virologists
Fellows of the Nigerian Academy of Science
Igbo people
People from Imo State